Xikou, is a town of 84,000 in northeastern Zhejiang province, People's Republic of China. Mao Fumei, divorced wife of ROC President Chiang Kai-Shek and mother of ROC President Chiang Ching-Kuo, was killed during the Japanese bombing of Xikou on December 12, 1939.

References 

Towns of Zhejiang
AAAAA-rated tourist attractions
Geography of Ningbo
Chiang Kai-shek